The North Carolina Tar Heels baseball team, commonly referred to as Carolina, represents the University of North Carolina at Chapel Hill in NCAA Division I college baseball.  They compete in the Coastal Division of the Atlantic Coast Conference.  The Tar Heels play their home games on campus at Boshamer Stadium, and are currently coached by Scott Forbes.

History

The program's first recorded game took place in 1867, when the Tar Heels defeated a Raleigh all-star team, 34-17. Although baseball continued to be played at UNC, there exists a gap in record-keeping during Reconstruction, despite the noted existence of the UNC baseball team.  The program's next recorded games were played in 1891.  Thereafter, the University sponsored a varsity intercollegiate baseball program on a regular basis from that season onwards.

In 1921, the University of North Carolina became a founding member of the Southern Conference.  Bunny Hearn became head coach of the Tar Heel baseball program in 1932, serving in that capacity for the next 15 years.   The Tar Heels would win six Southern Conference baseball titles during the Hearn era, as well as two wartime Ration League titles in 1943 and 1945.  In 1947, Hearn suffered a stroke and chose to relinquish his head coaching duties. Walter Rabb would thereafter take over as head coach of the Tar Heel baseball program, though Hearn remained as a coach at North Carolina for another ten years.

During the 1948 season, the program qualified for its first NCAA Tournament, which had first been played in 1947.  North Carolina's record in the tournament was 1-2.

North Carolina left the Southern Conference in 1953, opting to become a founding member of the newly formed Atlantic Coast Conference. The Tar Heels won their first ACC baseball title in 1960.  The program's first College World Series appearance also came in 1960.  In 1964, the Tar Heels won their second ACC baseball title, posting an undefeated record in conference play. No other team in ACC baseball history has ever been undefeated in conference
play.

The Tar Heels would appear in the College World Series three more times during the 20th century.

The Tar Heels reached the College World Series in four consecutive years between 2006 and 2009, and five times in six years between 2006 and 2011. They reached the national championship series in both 2006 and 2007, but lost on both occasions to the Oregon State Beavers. The Tar Heels made a third straight trip to Omaha in 2008.

While Boshamer Stadium was being renovated and rebuilt during the 2008 season, the Tar Heels played their home games at the USA Baseball National Training Complex in nearby Cary.  The Tar Heels returned to Chapel Hill in February 2009, following the completion of the extensive renovations to Boshamer Stadium.  The Tar Heels reached the 2009 College World Series, the program's fourth consecutive College World Series appearance, following their first season playing in newly renovated Boshamer Stadium.

The Tar Heels once again reached the College World Series in 2011. The Tar Heels were the top overall seed in the 2013 NCAA baseball tournament, during which they reached the 2013 College World Series once again. In 2018, the Tar Heels reached the College World Series for the seventh time in thirteen seasons.

Head coaches

Boshamer Stadium

Boshamer Stadium, the program's home venue, was built in the early 1970s and renovated in the late 2000s.  It has a capacity of 4,100 spectators, with additional standing room.  It has hosted five ACC Tournaments, most recently in 1983.  It is centrally-located on the University campus, adjacent to Ehringhaus Residence Hall and Karen Shelton Stadium.

Notable alumni
 Dustin Ackley
 Russ Adams
 Scott Bankhead
 Daniel Bard
 Tom Buskey
 Tim Federowicz
 Mike Fox
 Tyrell Godwin
 Moonlight Graham
 Adam Greenberg
 Garry Hill
 Chad Holbrook
 Levi Michael
 Colin Moran
 Mike Morin
 R. C. Orlan
 Brian Roberts
 Paul Shuey
 B. J. Surhoff
 Walt Weiss 
 Brad Woodall
 Rob Wooten

Current MLB roster
Former Tar Heels on current MLB rosters as of September 16, 2021.

See also
List of NCAA Division I baseball programs

References

External links